José Luis López de Silanes1 (Haro, 1946), Spanish businessman, holds a degree in industrial engineering from Universidad Politécnica de Madrid and followed the Management Development Programme at the IESE business school.

Biography 

José Luis López de Silanes has been the Chairman of Compañía Logística de Hidrocarburos CLH, S.A., since 26 April 20052. He has also been the Chairman of the Social Board of the Universidad de La Rioja3. He is also a member of the Advisory Board of the Cátedra UNESCO in Higher Education Management and Policy at the UPM (Universidad Politécnica de Madrid)4 and the Advisory Board of the Escuela Técnica Superior de Ingenieros Industriales at the Polytechnic University of Madrid.

Mr. López de Silanes began his professional activity as a teacher at the Polytechnic University of Madrid's Escuela Técnica Superior de Ingenieros Industriales, and in 1971 he joined Compañía Arrendataria del Monopolio de Petróleos (CAMPSA), where he held various posts as Chief Project Engineer and Technical Area Manager.

During that period he was one of the pioneers in the creation of what is now CLH, and directed the company's Strategic Plan for modernising and transforming it into the logistics company it is today.

After the time spent in CLH, in 1993 he was appointed to create and direct the Head Office for Engineering in the Repsol Group and from there went on, in September 1996, to become a member of the Management Committee of the Gas Natural Group, as General Manager of Supplies and Transport, and General Manager of Enagás, carrying out these tasks until July 1999, when he was appointed as chief executive officer of the Gas Natural Group.

As Chief Executive Officer of Gas Natural, he helped to transform this company into a large energy and services group operating at multinational level.

References

1- José Luis López de Silanes http://www.clh.es/section.cfm?id=1&side=5&lang=sp&cv=1

2- Repsol replaces Boyer with López de Silanes as leader of CLH http://elpais.com/diario/2005/04/27/economia/1114552812_850215.html

3- José Luis López de Silanes and Vicente Herrero, new members of the Social Board of the University of La Rioja.
http://www.larioja.org/npRioja/default/defaultpage.jsp?idtab=502073&IdDoc=629550

4- The Chairman of the Social Board of the University of La Rioja joins the Unesco chair at the UPM http://www.europapress.es/la-rioja/noticia-presidente-consejo-social-ur-incorpora-catedra-unesco-upm-20090218183248.html

External links 
 Official website - CLH

Living people
Spanish businesspeople
1948 births